is a subway station on the Toei Ōedo Line in Minato, Tokyo, Japan, operated by the Tokyo subway operator Tokyo Metropolitan Bureau of Transportation (Toei).

Lines
The station is served by the Toei Ōedo Line, and is numbered "E-21".

Station layout
The station concourse with ticket vending machines and ticket barriers are located on the first basement ("B1F") level, and the platform is located on the second basement ("B2F") level. The platform is an island platform serving two tracks.

Platforms

History
The station opened on 12 December 2000.

Surrounding area
 Tokyo Tower
 Shiba Park
 Keio University
 Saiseikai Central Hospital

See also

 List of railway stations in Japan

References

External links

 

Railway stations in Japan opened in 2000
Toei Ōedo Line
Stations of Tokyo Metropolitan Bureau of Transportation
Railway stations in Tokyo